Giovanni Pellino (born 7 October 1967), best known as Neffa, is an Italian singer-songwriter, rapper, composer, producer and musician.

Life and career 
Born in Scafati, at young age Pellino moved to Bologna with his family. In the late 1980s he adopted the stage name Jeff Pellino and was a drummer in several rock and punk bands, notably Negazione. In 1991, he joined the hip hop ensemble Isola Posse All Stars and adopted the stage name "Neffa" in honour of Paraguayan footballer Gustavo Neffa, at the time playing with U.S. Cremonese.

After the album SXM with the rap group Sangue Misto, in 1996 Neffa started his solo career, with the successful album I messaggeri della dopa which was led by the single "Aspettando il sole". In the following albums he spanned various styles including funky, pop, soul, jazz and  R&B, getting his major success in 2001 with the summer hit "La mia signorina" and the relevant album Arrivi e partenze. The same year he was nominated as best Italian act at the  MTV Europe Music Awards.  In 2004 he entered the main competition at the 54th edition of the Sanremo Music Festival, placing ninth with the song "Le ore piccole". 

In 2007 Neffa composed the musical score of Ferzan Özpetek's Saturn in Opposition, for which he won a Globo d'oro for best score and a Nastro d'Argento and a Ciak d'oro for best original song ("Passione"). In 2010 he started the musical project Due di Picche with the rapper J-Ax. In 2016 he returned to compete at the 66th  edition of the Sanremo Music Festival with the song "Sogni e nostalgia".

Discography
 
     1996 – Neffa & i messaggeri della dopa
     1998 – 107 elementi
     2001 – Arrivi e partenze
     2003 – I molteplici mondi di Giovanni, il cantante Neffa
     2006 – Alla fine della notte
     2009 – Sognando contromano
     2013 – Molto calmo
     2015 – Resistenza
     2021 – AmarAmmore

References

External links

1967 births
Living people
People from Scafati
Italian singer-songwriters
Italian male composers 
Italian songwriters
Male songwriters 
Italian drummers
Male drummers
Nastro d'Argento winners
Soul musicians
Italian rappers
Folk-pop singers
Funk musicians